Big Joe (born Joseph Spalding; 1955) is a Jamaican reggae deejay and record producer, who recorded extensively in the 1970s and early 1980s.

Biography
Spalding was born in Kingston, Jamaica in 1955, and began his recording career in the early 1970s working with producer Harry Mudie. He then worked with producer Winston Edwards and had a hit single with "Selassie Skank". He moved on to record for Coxsone Dodd at Studio One and set up his own Small Axe Hi Fi sound system and a record label. In the 2000s Spalding had success as a hip hop producer and recording engineer.

Discography
Keep Rocking And Swinging (1976) Celluloid
At The Control (1978) Live & Love
African Princess (1978) Thompson Sound/Trojan

References

External links
Big Joe at Roots Archives

1955 births
Living people
Musicians from Kingston, Jamaica
Jamaican reggae musicians